Timaru was a parliamentary electorate, in New Zealand's South Island. It existed continuously from 1861 to 1996 and was represented by eleven Members of Parliament.

Population centres
In the 1860 electoral redistribution, the House of Representatives increased the number of representatives by 12, reflecting the immense population growth since the original electorates were established in 1853. The redistribution created 15 additional electorates with between one and three members, and Timaru was one of the single-member electorates. The electorates were distributed to provinces so that every province had at least two members. Within each province, the number of registered electors by electorate varied greatly. The Timaru electorate had 121 registered electors for the 1861 election.

The electorate is partly urban, and is based on the South Canterbury city of Timaru.

History
The electorate was formed in 1861 for the 3rd Parliament and existed continuously until the 1996 election.

Francis Jollie was the first representative. In the 1866 election, he successfully stood for Gladstone. Alfred Cox was the next representative. At the nomination meeting, Nathan Fisher was put forward as a candidate but he declined to stand, and Cox was declared elected unopposed. Cox resigned in 1868 partway through the term. Edward Stafford won the resulting 1868 by-election. He represented the electorate for a decade and resigned in 1878.

Richard Turnbull won the 1878 by-election and represented Timaru until 1890, when he died on 17 July. He had contested the  against Edward George Kerr, the proprietor of The Timaru Herald, and had won with a comfortable majority.

William Hall-Jones won the 1890 by-election. He became Prime Minister during his term, and retired in 1908.

James Craigie was the next representative, from the 1908 election. He retired in 1922. Craigie was succeeded by Frank Rolleston, who was defeated at the 1928 election.

From 1928 to 1985, the seat was held by two Labour MPs: Rev Clyde Carr a Christian minister who was a supporter of John A. Lee and remained a backbencher; and then Sir Basil Arthur a hereditary baronet and later Speaker of the House.

David Lange recalled in My Life (2005) the death of Sir Basil, and also that Labour lost the subsequent 1985 by-election when "the Labour Party organisation insisted on the selection of a candidate who could hardly be less suited to the place" and "was a good lawyer but she did not live in Timaru, and her opinions, and even her appearance, were at odds with the conservative character of the electorate." Jim Sutton won the seat back for Labour in 1993.

Members of Parliament
Key

Election results

1993 election

1990 election

1987 election

1985 by-election

1984 election

1981 election

1978 election

1975 election

1972 election

1969 election

1966 election

1963 election

1962 by-election

1960 election

1957 election

1954 election

1951 election

1949 election

1946 election

1931 election

 
 
 
 
 

 

Table footnotes:

1928 election

1899 election

 
 
 
 

Table footnotes:

1890 election

1890 by-election

Notes

References

Historical electorates of New Zealand
Timaru
1860 establishments in New Zealand
1996 disestablishments in New Zealand